Rolepa is a genus of moths of the family Phiditiidae. The genus was erected by Francis Walker in 1855.

Taxonomy
The genus was established in the Arctiidae and was placed in the Lasiocampidae by Kirby in 1892 and the Lymantriidae by Schaus in 1927. Minet transferred the genus to the Apatelodidae in 1986. In 1999 Lemaire and Minet finally transferred it to its subfamily Phiditiinae, which was raised to family level in 2011.

Selected species
Rolepa castrona Schaus, 1920
Rolepa delineata Walker, 1855
Rolepa demerara Schaus, 1927
Rolepa erica Schaus, 1927
Rolepa fiachna Schaus, 1927
Rolepa innotabilis Walker, 1865
Rolepa lojana (Dognin, 1916)
Rolepa marginepicta Dognin, 1914
Rolepa medina (Dognin, 1916)
Rolepa nigrostriga Schaus, 1920
Rolepa sicyata (Dognin, 1901)
Rolepa unimoda (Dognin, 1923)

References

Bombycoidea
Macrolepidoptera genera